Carlos Maciel (born November 14, 1946) is a Paraguayan former football referee. He is known for having refereed one match in the 1990 FIFA World Cup in Italy.

External links
http://www.weltfussball.de/schiedsrichter_profil/carlos-maciel/1/1/ 
https://www.thefinalball.com/arbitro.php?id=711&search=1
http://worldreferee.com/site/copy.php?linkID=1746&linkType=referee&contextType=bio

1946 births
Paraguayan football referees
FIFA World Cup referees
1990 FIFA World Cup referees
Living people
Copa América referees
20th-century Paraguayan people